Amblyseius mcmurtryi is a species of mite in the family Phytoseiidae.

References

mcmurtryi
Articles created by Qbugbot
Animals described in 1967